The 1983–84 Iowa Hawkeyes men's basketball team represented the University of Iowa as members of the Big Ten Conference. The team was led by first-year head coach George Raveling and played their home games at Carver-Hawkeye Arena. They finished the season 13–15 and 6–12 in Big Ten play, tied for eighth place.

Previous season 
The Hawkeyes finished the 1982–83 season at 21–10 overall, fifth in the Big Ten  Iowa received an at-large bid to the NCAA tournament as the seventh seed in the Midwest regional. After wins over Utah State and second seed Missouri, they lost to third-seeded Villanova in the Sweet Sixteen.

Roster

Schedule/results

|-
!colspan=9 style=| Non-conference regular season

|-
!colspan=9 style=| Big Ten regular season

Rankings

References

Iowa Hawkeyes
Iowa Hawkeyes men's basketball seasons
Hawkeyes
Hawkeyes